Nebria mannerheimii is a species of ground beetle in the family Carabidae,  where it is found in North America.

References

Further reading

 

mannerheimii
Articles created by Qbugbot
Beetles described in 1828